Yuhua Wang (Chinese: 王裕华) is a Chinese political scientist who has researched comparative politics for a long time, taking history of China as a sample to explore the significance of the construction of "state capacity" for state and social development. Currently, he is a professor in the Department of Government at Harvard University whose research focuses on the politics of state-building.

Biography 
Wang received his Bachelor's degree and Master's degree from Peking University in 2003 and 2006, and Ph.D. in Political Science from the University of Michigan in 2011 under the supervision of Kenneth Lieberthal. From 2011 to 2015, Wang was assistant professor of political science at the University of Pennsylvania. Wang has been teaching in Harvard University since 2015.

Publications 
Wang's research shows that China’s younger generation who did not witness the 1989 Tiananmen Square protests and massacre are still influenced by it if their parents discuss political issues at home. Living under a repressive government, Chinese parents tell their children not to trust leaders.

Monographs 
 The Rise and Fall of Imperial China: The Social Origins of State Development. (Princeton Studies in Contemporary China, Princeton University Press, 2022).
 Tying the Autocrat’s Hands: The Rise of the Rule of Law in China. (Cambridge Studies in Comparative Politics, Cambridge University Press, 2015).

Edited volumes 
China in the World. (Special issue of Studies in Comparative International Development, Springer, 2021).

External links

References 

Living people
Chinese political scientists
Peking University alumni
University of Michigan alumni
Year of birth missing (living people)

Harvard University faculty
University of Pennsylvania faculty